Jorge G. Zornberg is Professor and W. J. Murray Fellow in the geotechnical engineering program at the University of Texas at Austin. He has over 30 years experience in geotechnical and geoenvironmental engineering. He is also one of the pioneers of geosynthetics.

Biography 
Jorge G. Zornberg earned his M.S. from PUC-Rio (Rio de Janeiro, Brazil) and his Ph.D. from the University of California at Berkeley.

In 2001, Zornberg received the Presidential Early Career Award for Scientists and Engineers under the National Science Foundation.

Zornberg was president of the International Geosynthetics Society from 2010 to 2014. Also, he chairs the Technical Committee on Geosynthetics of the Geo-Institute of ASCE (2018). Prof. Zornberg has authored over 350 technical publications.

Zornberg participated in the design of retaining walls, transportation facilities, mining lining systems and hazardous water containment facilities as a consulting engineer. He also conducts research on geosynthetics, soil reinforcement, unsaturated soils, liner systems and numerical modeling of geotechnical and geoenvironmental systems as part of his academic experience.

Awards 

 Mercer Lecture Award, 2015–16, International Society of Soil Mechanics and Geotechnical Engineering (ISSMGE) and International Geosynthetics Society (IGS).
 Distinguished Lecturer 2015, 33rd Annual Distinguished Lecture Series, University of California at Berkeley, Berkeley, CA May 1, 2015.

References 

Living people
Geotechnical engineers
American civil engineers
Year of birth missing (living people)